Germani may refer to
 Germanic peoples, a collection of northern European ethnic groups in Roman times
 Germani (Oretania), pre-Roman ancient people of the Iberian Peninsula
 Germani cisrhenani, a group of tribes that lived during classical times to the west of the Rhine river
Vita Germani, a hagiographic text written by Constantius of Lyon in the 5th century AD
 Germani (surname)